Juan Betinotti  was an Argentine footballer, who played as forward in the Club Atlético Independiente, and Estudiantil Porteño, team where he played an international friendly against Chelsea F.C in 1929.

Career 

Betinotti was born in Buenos Aires, son of a family of Italian immigrants. He began his career in Estudiantil Porteño, being later incorporated into the Club Atlético Independiente, playing the final against River Plate in 1932.

Juan Betinotti also played for the Club Atlético Vélez Sarsfield. In 1935 he returns to Estudiantil Porteño, club where he finished his career in 1937.

References

External links 
www.infofutbol.com.ar

Argentine footballers
Footballers from Buenos Aires
Club Atlético Independiente footballers
Argentine people of Italian descent
1900 births
Year of death missing
Club Atlético Vélez Sarsfield footballers
Sportspeople from Avellaneda
Association football forwards
Río de la Plata